Shadows of the Heart is a 1990 Australian mini series. It was shot on Kangaroo Island, South Australia between 22 January and 17 March 1990.

Plot
A female doctor, Kate Munro (Byrnes) moves to (fictitious) Gannet Island off the South Australian coast in 1927. Conflict between traditional religious values and modern scientific medicine ensues as she forms a relationship with two men who are brothers, one a grazier (Graham) and one a priest (Ehlers).

Cast
 Josephine Byrnes ... Dr. Kate Munro
 Jerome Ehlers ... Father Michael Hanlon
 Marcus Graham ... Vic Hanlon
 Jason Donovan ... Alex Fargo
 Robyn Nevin ... Mrs. Hanlon
 Barry Otto ... Charles Munro
 Harold Hopkins ... Willy Carter
 Nadine Garner ... Lanty Fargo
 Michael Caton ... Frank Barrett
 Colleen Hewett ... Emily Fargo

References

External links
Shadows of the Heart at IMDb

1990s Australian television miniseries
1990 Australian television series debuts
1990 Australian television series endings
1990 television films
1990 films
Television shows set in South Australia